Iver C. Olsen (1904 – November 5, 1960) was an accountant for the Office of Strategic Services and the War Refugee Board in Stockholm during World War II.  In that latter capacity he provided WRB funds to Raoul Wallenberg in his efforts to rescue the Hungarian Jews.

Biography
He was born in 1904 and worked for the US Department of Commerce in the 1930s and for the Treasury Department in World War II. Assigned to work in Sweden, he handled Special Fund accounting for the Office of Strategic Services and handled funds from the War Refugee Board for the rescue of refugees. Following the end of the war he acted as a representative for the International Cooperation Administration. In 1954 he was the Washington, DC representative of Tripp and Co. He died on November 5, 1960.

Publication
Iver C. Olsen; Rights of foreign shareholders of European corporations (United States Bureau of Foreign and Domestic Commerce) (1929) ISBN B0008AWPV4

References

Further reading
National Archives Record Group 226, Records of the Office of Strategic Services;  RG 210, Records of the War Refugee Board
New York Times; March 16, 1931, Monday; Washington, March 15, 1931. Despite expansion of British loans to Latin America in 1930, American loans to all foreign nations last year exceeded those of Great Britain by more than $300,000,000, according to a survey by Iver C. Olsen of the Department of Commerce which was made public today.
New York Times; October 11, 1954; Joins Tripp in Washington.

American people of World War II
1904 births
1960 deaths
Raoul Wallenberg